Bartosz Ława  (born 26 February 1979) is a Polish professional footballer who plays as a midfielder for Pogoń Szczecin II.

Career
In the past he played for Amica Wronki, Widzew Łódź and Arka Gdynia.

References 

1979 births
Living people
Polish footballers
Pogoń Szczecin players
Amica Wronki players
Widzew Łódź players
Arka Gdynia players
KP Chemik Police players
Ekstraklasa players
I liga players
III liga players
People from Trzebiatów
Sportspeople from West Pomeranian Voivodeship
Association football midfielders